Ely Homestead is a historic home located in Fairfield Township, Tippecanoe County, Indiana.  It was built in 1847, and is a two-story, Federal style brick dwelling, with a one-story wing. It was restored in 1972.  The surrounding property is a contributing site.

It was listed on the National Register of Historic Places in 1976.

References

Houses on the National Register of Historic Places in Indiana
Federal architecture in Indiana
Houses completed in 1847
Houses in Tippecanoe County, Indiana
National Register of Historic Places in Tippecanoe County, Indiana